The following is a list of massacres that occurred in Turkey (numbers may be approximate, as estimates vary greatly):

Antiquity

Middle Ages

Ottoman Empire

Before 1914

World War I (1914–1918)

Post-World War I (1919–1923)

Republic of Turkey (1923–present)

Gallery

References

Turkey
Massacres
 
Massacres